Gerulfus (also known as Gerolf; Merendree 740–748) is a Roman Catholic Saint of Flanders. His relics are kept in Drongen, after they were removed from his original grave in Merendree around 915 or 930. He is the patron saint of young people.

References 

Belgian Roman Catholic saints
8th-century Christian saints
740 births
748 deaths